IS2 or IS-2 may refer to:

 IS-2, the first Soviet heavy tank model of the IS tank series
 IS-2 Mucha, a Polish training glider from 1947
 URMV-3 IS-2, a Romanian 1950s training glider 
 HMG Information Assurance Standard No.2, a British government security standard
 Rotax 912 iS2, a light aircraft engine

See also

Isis (disambiguation)
ISS (disambiguation)
I²S, an electrical serial bus interface standard